Antonín Dušek (born April 8, 1986) is a Czech professional ice hockey Centre for Aigles de Nice in the Ligue Magnus. He previously played in the Czech Extraliga for HC Bílí Tygři Liberec, HC Slavia Praha, Piráti Chomutov, HC Karlovy Vary and HC Dynamo Pardubice.

According to an interview with hokej.cz, he started to play ice hockey at 3 or 4 years old, on a lake in the town Ledeč nad Sázavou.

References

External links

Antonín Dušek on the official HC Liberec website

1986 births
Living people
Les Aigles de Nice players
HC Benátky nad Jizerou players
HC Berounští Medvědi players
HC Bílí Tygři Liberec players
Czech ice hockey centres
HC Dynamo Pardubice players
HC Karlovy Vary players
Sportspeople from Havlíčkův Brod
Piráti Chomutov players
HC Slavia Praha players
Sportovní Klub Kadaň players
HC Vrchlabí players
HC Vlci Jablonec nad Nisou players
Deggendorfer SC players
Czech expatriate ice hockey players in Germany
Czech expatriate sportspeople in France
Expatriate ice hockey players in France